Deadheads for Obama is the name given to the February 4, 2008 reunion concert of three former members of the Grateful Dead at The Warfield in San Francisco.  The show, performed one day before the Super Tuesday primary elections, was an act of support for Democratic presidential candidate Barack Obama, and featured former Dead members Phil Lesh, Bob Weir, and Mickey Hart, as well as John Molo, Jackie Greene, Steve Molitz, Mark Karan and Barry Sless.

The show marked the first time Lesh, Weir and Hart had shared the stage since 2004, and was simulcast on the iClips Network.

Deadheads for Obama is also a 350 member grassroots organization founded in February 2007 through Barack Obama's website; one year before the concert of the same namesake. This group collectively raised more than $150,000 for the Obama campaign.

Setlist
After a videotaped introduction by Barack Obama, the band played "Playing in the Band" into "Brown-Eyed Women", and continued the first set with other Grateful Dead staples "Mississippi Half-Step Uptown Toodeloo", "New Minglewood Blues", and a cover of "Come Together" by the Beatles.

A short speech by Phil Lesh was followed by a four-song acoustic second set, featuring more classic Dead songs like "Friend of the Devil" and "Deal".  Then the band plugged in again to play an extended third set, including New Orleans classic "Iko Iko" (in honor of Mardi Gras), and ending with a reprise of the opener, "Playing in the Band", and an encore of "U.S. Blues".

The complete setlist was:
 First set: "Playing in the Band", "Brown-Eyed Women", "Mississippi Half-Step Uptown Toodeloo", "New Minglewood Blues", "Come Together"
 Second set (acoustic): "Deep Elem Blues", "Friend of the Devil", "Deal", "Ripple"
 Third set: "China Cat Sunflower", "The Wheel", "The Other One", "Sugaree", "Eyes of the World", "Throwing Stones", "Iko Iko", "Playing in the Band" reprise
 Encore: "U.S. Blues"

Change Rocks
Hart, Lesh, and Weir reunited again in support of the Obama presidential campaign, this time joined by Bill Kreutzmann, on October 13, 2008, in the Bryce Jordan Center at Penn State University, playing a concert called "Change Rocks". Warren Haynes provided guitar and vocal support for the reunion, and Jeff Chimenti played keyboards.  The performance was preceded by a set of music by members of the Allman Brothers Band.

The set list was: "Truckin'", "U.S. Blues", "Help on the Way", "Slipknot!", "Franklin's Tower",
"Playing in the Band", "Dark Star", "St. Stephen", "Unbroken Chain", "The Other One", "Throwing Stones", and "Playing in the Band" reprise, with an encore of "Touch of Grey" and "Not Fade Away"

Presidential inauguration ball
On January 20, 2009, the Dead played at one of the 10 official balls for the Inauguration of President Barack Obama. Their sets were immediately followed by an appearance by President Barack Obama and the First Lady; Vice President Joe Biden and Dr. Jill Biden appeared during a setbreak.

See also

 Barack Obama presidential campaign, 2008
 List of Barack Obama presidential campaign endorsements, 2008
 Reunions of the Grateful Dead

References

Further reading
 
 Tanner, Adam. "Grateful Dead, Deadheads reunite for Obama", Reuters, February 5, 2008
 Franke-Ruta, Garance. "Calif. Contest Leads to Battle of the Bands", Washington Post, February 2, 2008
 Melber, Ari. "Deadheads for Obama", The Nation, February 2, 2008
 Selvin, Joel. "Grateful Dead Bury Hatchet, Reunite for Obama", San Francisco Chronicle, February 5, 2008
 Selvin, Joel. "Grateful Dead Reunite for Barack Obama Benefit Show", Rolling Stone, February 5, 2008
 Liberatore, Paul. "How Grateful Dead Came Together Again for Obama Fundraiser", Marin Independent Journal, February 7, 2008
 Simon, Richard B. "Lesh Unites with Weir and Hart for Deadheads for Obama", Relix, February 5, 2008
 "Grateful Dead Reunite to Support Obama", New Musical Express, February 5, 2008
 Smith, Dakota. "Grateful Dead Reunite for Obama", NewsQuake, February 5, 2008
 "Deadheads for Obama", Jambase.com, February 4, 2008
 Deadheads for Obama on iClips

External links
 Deadheads for Obama download at JamRadio.org

2008 in American music
2008 in San Francisco
Barack Obama 2008 presidential campaign
Concerts in the United States
California Democratic Party
Political events in California
February 2008 events in the United States
Grateful Dead
Music and politics
2008 United States Democratic presidential primaries
2008 United States presidential election in popular culture